Jakov Vranković (born 12 June 1993) is a Croatian handball player who plays for Dinamo București and the Croatian national team.

He participated at the 2019 World Men's Handball Championship.

Individual awards 
 Romanian Liga Națională Best Foreign Player: 2015
 Prosport All-Star Right Back of the Romanian Liga Națională: 2017

References

Croatian male handball players
Sportspeople from Split, Croatia
Living people
1993 births
Expatriate handball players
Croatian expatriate sportspeople in France
Croatian expatriate sportspeople in Hungary
Croatian expatriate sportspeople in Qatar
Croatian expatriate sportspeople in Romania
CS Dinamo București (men's handball) players
Competitors at the 2018 Mediterranean Games
Mediterranean Games gold medalists for Croatia
Mediterranean Games medalists in handball